The Coal King is a 1915 British silent drama film directed by Percy Nash and starring Douglas Cox, May Lynn and Frank Tennant. The script was based on a play by Ernest Martin and Fewlass Llewellyn.

Cast
 Douglas Cox - Sir Reginald Harford
 May Lynn - Ann Roberts
 Frank Tennant - Walter Harford
 Daisy Cordell - Grace Shirley
 Gregory Scott - Tom Roberts
 Douglas Payne - James Hawker
 Jack Denton - Jim Matthews
 Joan Ritz - Araminta
 John Marlborough East - William Shirley
 Helen Lainsbury - Mrs Shirley

References

External links

1915 films
British silent feature films
1915 drama films
Films directed by Percy Nash
British drama films
British black-and-white films
1910s English-language films
1910s British films
Silent drama films